"Lie" is a song by Danish pop and soul band Lukas Graham. It was released on 27 September 2019 by Copenhagen Records and Then We Take the World. The song peaked at number two on the Danish Singles Chart. The song was written by David LaBrel, George Tizzard, Jaramye Daniels, Lukas Forchhammer, Rick Parkhouse and Stefan Forrest.

Music video
A music video to accompany the release of "Lie" was first released on YouTube on 27 September 2019. In the video, two young actors portray an on-and-off-again couple. The boy watches as his ex-girlfriend moves on with a different guy, pining for the days when they were happy. Memories of fights and makeouts feature during the video in between scenes of their current reality. By the end of the video, they are back together.

Track listing

Charts

Weekly charts

Year-end charts

Certifications

Release history

References

2019 singles
2019 songs
Lukas Graham songs
Songs written by Lukas Forchhammer
Songs written by Rick Parkhouse
Songs written by Stefan Forrest
Songs written by George Tizzard
Copenhagen Records singles